Mohamed Ghalem (born October 17, 1977 in Algiers) is an Algerian football player. He currently plays for ASO Chlef in the Algerian Ligue Professionnelle 1.

Personal
Ghalem was born on October 17, 1977 in the Mohamed Belouizdad neighbourhood of Algiers. At a young age, his family moved to the town of Medjana, Bordj Bou Arréridj.

Honours
 ASO Chlef
Algerian Ligue Professionnelle 1: 2010–11

References

External links
 DZFoot Profile
 

1977 births
Living people
Footballers from Algiers
Algerian footballers
Algerian Ligue Professionnelle 1 players
ASO Chlef players
CA Bordj Bou Arréridj players
MO Béjaïa players
RC Kouba players
USM Blida players
Association football goalkeepers
21st-century Algerian people